The Hotan–Ruoqiang (Qakilik) railway is a 825.5 km long railway line connecting the cities of Hotan and Ruoqiang in southern Xinjiang, China that opened on 16 June 2022 with a design speed of . It serves over 10 million people with 20 new stations.

History
Construction on the line began in December 2018. Tracklaying began in May 2020 and by April 2021, over half the track had been laid. On 27 September 2021, the construction of the track was fully completed with the laying of the last length of track. Rail welding was completed on 28 October 2021, with track bed tamping and fine adjustment of the line required before scheduled opening of the entire line in 2022.

Route
In Hotan it continues as the Kashgar–Hotan railway and in Qakilik (Ruoqiang), Ruoqiang (Qakilik) County it branches off the Golmud–Korla railway. Together with those railways it forms a  loop around the west of the Tarim Basin, linking Hotan, Lop, Qira, Yutian, Minfeng and Bayingolin.

Further protection against sand has been provided by putting about 13 million shrubs, such as sacsaoul and sea buckthorn, into   of grass grids (straw-edged rectangles of about a metre square).

References

Railway lines in China
Rail transport in Xinjiang